On 26–29 June 2016, 21 members of the Shadow Cabinet resigned from the frontbench. Following the Leave result in the referendum on Britain's membership of the European Union, Jeremy Corbyn faced heavy criticism for the perceived reluctance of his involvement in the campaign to Remain and his perceived weakness as leader of the Labour Party.

The first shadow minister to depart the Opposition frontbench was Hilary Benn, the Shadow Foreign Secretary, on 26 June. Over the course of the day, he was joined by 11 other Shadow Cabinet members, all expressing concern with Corbyn's ability to lead the party into the next general election. On the following day, 27 June, a further eight members resigned, including Angela Eagle, the most senior Shadow Secretary of State.

Tom Watson, the deputy party leader, remained in his position while openly criticising Corbyn's leadership. Unlike the other members of the Shadow Cabinet, Watson could not be removed by Corbyn as he had been elected, not appointed. This enabled him to put public pressure on Corbyn to resign.

Corbyn's allies in the Shadow Cabinet (Diane Abbott, John McDonnell, Emily Thornberry and Jon Trickett) all refused to stand down, condemning the actions of their former colleagues as a "coup" against the democratically elected party leader. Andy Burnham, the Shadow Home Secretary and leadership candidate in 2015, also announced that he would not resign, saying that he believed that "civil war" in the party was a bad idea.

In addition, 18 other shadow ministers not in the Shadow Cabinet resigned, including Diana Johnson, Anna Turley, Toby Perkins, Yvonne Fovargue, Alex Cunningham, Steve Reed, Roberta Blackman-Woods, Wayne David, Jenny Chapman, Keir Starmer, Richard Burden, Jack Dromey, Thangam Debbonaire, Susan Elan Jones, Nick Thomas-Symonds, Sharon Hodgson, Melanie Onn, Nic Dakin and 9 Parliamentary private secretaries.

On 27 June, Corbyn announced new appointments to his top team, including promotions for Abbott and Thornberry, and 13 new members. Due to the fact that few Labour MPs were prepared to support him, Corbyn introduced a number of joint portfolios, such as combining the Scotland and Northern Ireland briefs. He also appointed veteran backbench MP Paul Flynn, who is believed to have become the oldest frontbench spokesperson since William Gladstone, at 81 years of age.

On 28 June, the Parliamentary Labour Party held a motion of no confidence in Corbyn as party leader, which passed overwhelmingly with 172 votes in favour and 40 votes against. On the following day, Pat Glass resigned after two days as Shadow Education Secretary, stating that the situation had become "untenable".

Despite the result of the no-confidence vote, Corbyn claimed that it had "no constitutional legitimacy" and refused to resign. Several high-profile and influential Labour MPs were touted as possible leadership challengers, as Corbyn's opponents tried to find a single candidate to unite around. Eventually two emerged: Angela Eagle and Owen Smith, who launched their leadership campaigns on 11 July and 13 July, respectively. Eagle withdrew from the race and endorsed Smith on 19 July, making him the sole challenger to Corbyn.

Corbyn was re-elected with 313,209 votes, a 61.8% share of the total vote. Following his victory, Corbyn re-shuffled the Shadow Cabinet on 6–7 October, inviting back a few of the former members who had resigned in June. Nia Griffith returned as Shadow Defence Secretary, John Healey as Shadow Housing Secretary and Keir Starmer as Shadow Brexit Secretary.

List of resignations

26 June

27 June

29 June

Aftermath

No confidence motion

Leadership challenge

References 

2016 in British politics
June 2016 events in the United Kingdom
Political controversies in the United Kingdom
Cabinet reshuffles in the United Kingdom